Kivides may refer to:

 Kato Kivides, a village in Cyprus
 Pano Kivides, a village in Cyprus